Justus (died 627) was an Archbishop of Canterbury.

Justus might also refer to:

People
 Justus (given name)
 Justus (surname)

Other uses
 Justus (album), a 1996 album by the Monkees
 Justus (Shakugan no Shana), a character in the light novel series Shakugan no Shana
 Justus, Ohio, a community in the United States
 Justus Township, the land of the Montana Freemen
 2799 Justus, an asteroid
 Bishop Justus CE School, a secondary school

See also 
 Jesus Justus, Jewish Christian mentioned in the New Testament